Zombie Undead is a 2010 British horror film directed by Rhys Davies and starring Ruth King, Kris Tearse, Rod Duncan, Barry Thomas, Sandra Wildbore, and Christopher J. Herbert. It was written by Kris Tearse. After a terrorist attack in Leicester, survivors take cover from zombies.

Premise 
After a terrorist attack, Sarah takes her injured father to a busy and overworked hospital, only to lose consciousness during the stressful attempt to save his life. When she comes to, the hospital seems deserted. Sarah quickly discovers that zombies have taken over the building, and, along with other survivors, flees the hospital and attempts to survive against the undead hordes.

Cast 
 Ruth King as Sarah
 Kris Tearse as Jay
 Barry Thomas as Steve
 Christopher J. Herbert as Phil
 Steven Dolton as Farmer
 Sandra Wildbore as Mary

Production 
Zombie Undead was filmed in Leicester. Filming lasted for 18 months.  The filmmakers tried to avoid exposition and focus on the characters.

Release 
Zombie Undead premiered in Leicester on 15 January 2010 and opened in British theaters in April 2011.  Metrodome Distribution released it on DVD on 30 May 2011.  MVD Entertainment Group released it on DVD in the US on 24 July 2012.  In its opening weekend, it took in a total of £10.

Reception 
Tom Huddleston of Time Out London rated it 1/5 stars and called it a clichéd and "laughably inept DIY horror movie".  Jamie Russell of Total Film rated it 2/5 stars and wrote, "Zombie Undead is another no-budget, no-brains outing to treat the walking dead as an excuse for a lack of writing ability."  Mark L. Miller of Ain't It Cool News called it "a breath of fresh air" but sloppy and poorly acted.  Jeremy Blitz of DVD Talk rated it 2/5 stars and wrote, "Unfortunately, the producers of British indie Zombie Undead present little new material, though they do show a few flashes of near brilliance."  Peter Dendle called it a boring zombie film that was made for marketing purposes.

References

External links 
 
 

2010 films
2010 horror films
British horror films
British independent films
British zombie films
Films shot in England
Films set in England
2010s English-language films
2010s British films